Brooks Joseph Kriske (born February 3, 1994) is an American professional baseball pitcher in the Kansas City Royals organization. He made his MLB debut in 2020 with the New York Yankees and also played for the Baltimore Orioles.

Amateur career
Kriske played all four years of varsity baseball at Palm Desert High School in Palm Desert, California. He helped his team to three consecutive California Interscholastic Federation (CIF) State Finals from 2010–2012, winning the CIF state championships in 2010 and 2012. Kriske pitched a complete game shutout in the final in 2012.  He was a two-time All State selection.

Kriske attended the University of Southern California (USC) and played college baseball for the USC Trojans. He was drafted by the New York Yankees in the sixth round of the 2016 MLB draft.

Professional career

New York Yankees
Kriske began his professional career in 2016 with the Staten Island Yankees. He underwent Tommy John surgery that year, and subsequently missed the 2017 season. He was an all-star in the Florida State League pitching for the Tampa Tarpons before being promoted to Double-A with the Trenton Thunder. The Yankees added him to their 40-man roster after the 2019 season, before being optioned to the Scranton/Wilkes-Barre RailRiders of Triple-A in March 2020.

Kriske was added to the Yankees' active roster on July 26, 2020. He made his major league debut on July 29 against the Baltimore Orioles, striking out two batters and walking one in an inning of relief. For the shortened 2020 season, Kriske appeared in four games without registering a decision, while pitching to a 14.73 earned run average (ERA) while striking out eight batters in  innings. 

Kriske began the 2021 season in Triple-A with the RailRiders. He was recalled by the Yankees twice in June and once in July. On July 21, Kriske recorded his first major league win, throwing a scoreless 10th inning against the Philadelphia Phillies, as the Yankees scored in the bottom half of the inning to win. The next day, Kriske was again used in extra innings, this time in a save situation against the Boston Red Sox. However, he blew the save and took the loss, tying the MLB regular-season record by throwing four wild pitches in the inning. He was optioned to Triple-A after the game. On September 14, the Yankees designated Kriske for assignment.

Baltimore Orioles
Kriske was claimed off waivers by the Baltimore Orioles two days later on September 16 and sent to the Norfolk Tides. After pitching a scoreless inning in his only Tides appearance, he was promoted to the Orioles on September 19. He made his Orioles debut in a 4–3 loss to the Philadelphia Phillies at Citizens Bank Park on September 22. The only batter he faced was Andrew McCutchen whose foul out to the catcher stranded two base runners to end the seventh inning. After appearing in four games with a 12.27 ERA in  innings, Kriske was granted his release to pursue an international opportunity on November 30.

Yokohama DeNA BayStars
On December 8, 2021, Kriske signed with the Yokohama DeNA BayStars of Nippon Professional Baseball.

Kansas City Royals
On December 15, 2022, Kriske signed a minor league deal with the Kansas City Royals.

Personal life
Kriske is named after Brooks Robinson.

References

External links

1994 births
Living people
Baltimore Orioles players
Baseball players from California
Charleston RiverDogs players
Major League Baseball pitchers
New York Yankees players
Norfolk Tides players
People from Palm Desert, California
Scranton/Wilkes-Barre RailRiders players
Staten Island Yankees players
Tampa Tarpons players
Trenton Thunder players
USC Trojans baseball players
Yokohama DeNA BayStars players
Nippon Professional Baseball pitchers
American expatriate baseball players in Japan
La Crosse Loggers players